The Old Bus is a 1934 Australian documentary film about Australian contributions to flying, focusing on aviator Sir Charles Kingsford Smith, and derived from his 1932 book of the same name. The film takes its title from his famous Fokker F.VII/3m monoplane aircraft, The Southern Cross, that Kingsford Smith nicknamed "The Old Bus".

Synopsis
The Old Bus traces Australian contributions to flying from 1894 on, including the feats of Lawrence Hargrave, an early flight of Harry Houdini in 1910, T.E. Hart's flight from Sydney to Penrith, Guillaux's 1914 flight in Sydney, the work of Ross and Keith Smith, and Australian flying inventions.

The film then covers the personal story of Sir Charles Kingsford Smith and his aircraft, The Southern Cross, in particular, his circumnavigation of the world. Kingsford Smith recreates some of the famous flights in which he was involved. The Old Bus also touches on the development of the Australian postal air route.

Production
The Old Bus was produced by Jack Percival Junior, the aviation correspondent of The Sydney Morning Herald under the supervision of Kingsford Smith. Percival was also a passenger on The Southern Cross for a flight Kingsford Smith made from Australia to New Zealand in January 1933. 

Plans to make a documentary about Kingsford Smith were announced in August 1933. The project soon expanded to be a history of Australian aviation. Kingsford Smith shot footage of it all around the world. Shooting commenced around November 1933 and was completed by July 1934.

Reception
The Old Bus achieved cinema release through Universal Pictures. Reviews were generally positive, the critic from The Sydney Morning Herald calling it "a plain, unassuming record of Australian achievements in aviation ... a comfortable feature of the film is that it contains no bombast. Indeed, it might be argued that the producers have been too modest, and have not emphasised enough the remarkable exploits of the 'Southern Cross' and its captain, and the importance of its flights in the wider history of aviation."

By December 1934, The Old Bus had earned an estimated £1,650 at the Australian box office with trade papers estimating this figure may reach £3,500. Because of the low production cost it is likely the film made a profit.

Percival later said he wished to make a feature film called Outposts set in the Northern Territory, Broome, Java, Sumatra, and New Guinea, starring Captain Patrick Gordon Taylor. This film was not made.

References

Notes

Citations

Bibliography

 Twomey, Christina. Australia's Forgotten Prisoners: Civilians Interned by the Japanese in World War Two. Cambridge, UK: Cambridge University Press, 2007. .

External links
 The Old Bus at IMDb
 "The Old Bus" at National Film and Sound Archive
Jack Percival Junior, "The First Flyers." The West Australian (Perth, WA : 1879–1954) 8 August 1934: 19 Retrieved: 28 March 2012.
 Articles by Jack Percival Junior on the history of Australian flight – Part One, Part Two, Part Three, Part Four, Part Five

Australian documentary films
Black-and-white documentary films
1934 documentary films
1934 films
Australian black-and-white films
Documentary films about aviation
Australian aviation films